The poldo tackle is an instant tension-applying and tension-releasing mechanism. The tackle allows for a 2:1 mechanical advantage using only rope.

See also
 List of knots
 Versatackle knot

References

Knots